Turbo smithi, common name the miniature turban, is a species of sea snail, a marine gastropod mollusk in the family Turbinidae, the turban snails.

Description
The size of the shell attains 24 mm. The imperforate shell has an ovate-conic shape. Its color pattern is yellowish brown, or yellow clouded with orange-brown. The elevated spire is acute. The five whorls are sloping above, convex, longitudinally irregularly striate, and spirally costate. The costae are rugose, irregular, slightly elevated, about four on the penultimate whorl, twelve on the body whorl. The aperture is circular. The peristome is simple. The columella is white.

Distribution
This marine species occurs off the Philippines.

References

 Trew, A., 1984. The Melvill-Tomlin Collection. Part 30. Trochacea. Handlists of the Molluscan Collections in the Department of Zoology, National Museum of Wales.
 Kreipl K. & Alf A. (2003) Two new species of Turbo (Marmarostoma) (Mollusca – Gastropoda – Turbinidae). Gloria Maris 42 (2-3): 37-46
 Alf A. & Kreipl K. (2003). A Conchological Iconography: The Family Turbinidae, Subfamily Turbininae, Genus Turbo. Conchbooks, Hackenheim Germany.

External links
 To World Register of Marine Species
 

smithi
Gastropods described in 1886